Port Moody-Coquitlam may refer to:
 Port Moody-Coquitlam (provincial electoral district), a provincial electoral district in British Columbia, Canada
 Port Moody—Coquitlam, a federal electoral district in British Columbia, Canada

See also
 Port Moody—Coquitlam—Port Coquitlam, a former federal electoral district in British Columbia, Canada, that was renamed from Port Moody—Coquitlam in 1998